Robeykheh (also Romanized as Robaikheh; also known as Robekeh and Rabika) is a village in Veys Rural District, Veys District, Bavi County, Khuzestan Province, Iran. At the 2006 census, its population was 244, in 39 families.

References 

Populated places in Bavi County